Alha (देवनागरी: आल्हा ; ISO: Ālhā ) was a legendary general of the Chandel king Paramardideva (also known as Parmal), who fought Prithviraj Chauhan in 1182 CE. He is one of the main characters of the Alha-Khand ballad.

Origin 
According to the legend, Alha and Udal were children of the Dasraj, a successful commander in the army of Chandel king Parmal. They belonged to the Banaphar clan, which are of mixed Ahir and Rajput descent, Purana states that Mahil a Rajput and an enemy of Alha and Udal said that Alha has come to be of a different family (kule htnatvamagatah) because his mother is an Aryan Ahir.

The Bhavishya Purana, a Sanskrit text, states that Alha's mother was called Devaki and was a member of the  Ahir caste. The Ahirs are among the "oldest pastoralists" and were rulers of Mahoba.

Folklore 
In addition to the Aalha Khand and the Bhavishya Purana, the story of Alha is also found in a number of medieval manuscripts of the Prithviraj Raso. There is also a belief that the story was originally written by Jagnik, bard of Mahoba, but no manuscript has been found.

See also
 Udal of Mahoba

Notes

References

External links 

Rajput era
History of Madhya Pradesh
12th-century Indian monarchs
Chandelas of Jejakabhukti
Medieval India
Rajputs
Ahir history
Indian legendary characters